Savadi may refer to:

Savadi, Belgaum, Karnataka
Savadi, Gadag, Karnataka
Savadi, Solapur district, Maharashtra